Diana Petrakieva (Bulgarian: Диана Петракиева) is a Bulgarian football midfielder currently playing in the Bulgarian Championship for NSA Sofia, with whom she has also played the Champions League. She has also played the latter with Grand Hotel Varna and Supersport Sofia.

She is a member of the Bulgarian national team, and has served as its captain.

References

1981 births
Living people
Bulgarian women's footballers
Bulgaria women's international footballers
Women's association football midfielders
FC NSA Sofia players
LP Super Sport Sofia players